The Raytheon T-1 Jayhawk is a twin-engined jet aircraft used by the United States Air Force for advanced pilot training.  T-1A students go on to fly airlift and tanker aircraft. The T-400 is a similar version for the Japan Air Self-Defense Force.

Design and development

The T-1A Jayhawk is a medium-range, twin-engine jet trainer used in the advanced phase of Air Force Joint Specialized Undergraduate Pilot Training for students selected to fly strategic/tactical airlift or tanker aircraft. It is used also for training Air Force Combat Systems Officers in high and low level flight procedures during the advanced phase of training. It also augmented or served in lieu of the T-39 Sabreliner in the Intermediate phase of US Navy/Marine Corps Student Naval Flight Officer training until the joint Air Force-Navy/Marine Corps training pipeline split in 2010 and now remains solely in operation with the U.S. Air Force, leaving the Navy with the Sabreliner pending its eventual replacement. The T-1 Jayhawk shares the same letter and number as the long retired T-1 SeaStar under the 1962 United States Tri-Service aircraft designation system.

The swept-wing T-1A is a military version of the Beechjet/Hawker 400A. It has cockpit seating for an instructor and two students and is powered by twin turbofan engines capable of an operating speed of Mach .78. The T-1A differs from its commercial counterpart with structural enhancements that provide for a large number of landings per flight hour, increased bird strike resistance and an additional fuselage fuel tank. A total of 180 T-1 trainers were delivered between 1992–1997.

The first T-1A was delivered to Reese Air Force Base, Texas, in January 1992, and student training began in 1993.

Another military variant is the Japan Air Self-Defense Force T-400 (400T) trainer, which shares the same type certificate as the T-1A.

Variants

T-1A
United States military designation for trainer powered by two JT15D-5B turbofans, 180 built.
T-400
Japanese military designation for the Model 400T powered by two JT15D-5F turbofans, also known by the project name TX; 13 built.

Operators

 Japan Air Self-Defense Force
3rd Tactical Airlift Wing – Miho Air Base, Tottori
41st Flight Training Squadron

 United States Air Force
12th Flying Training Wing – Randolph Air Force Base, Texas
99th Flying Training Squadron
451st Flying Training Squadron – Pensacola Naval Air Station, Florida
14th Flying Training Wing – Columbus Air Force Base, Mississippi
48th Flying Training Squadron
47th Flying Training Wing – Laughlin Air Force Base, Texas
86th Flying Training Squadron
71st Flying Training Wing – Vance Air Force Base, Oklahoma
3rd Flying Training Squadron
340th Flying Training Group – Randolph Air Force Base, Texas
5th Flying Training Squadron – Vance Air Force Base
43d Flying Training Squadron – Columbus Air Force Base
96th Flying Training Squadron – Laughlin Air Force Base
39th Flying Training Squadron – Randolph Air Force Base

Specifications (T-1A)

See also

References

This article contains information that originally came from a US Government website, in the public domain.  USAF Website

Bibliography

Further reading

External links

 

1990s United States military trainer aircraft
Raytheon Company products
Twinjets
Low-wing aircraft
T-tail aircraft
Aircraft first flown in 1991